Summit Lake Ski Area is operated by the Nakusp Ski Club Association, a non-profit, volunteer-run society. Located at the lake and community of the same name, 16km (10 miles) east of Nakusp, British Columbia, Canada, in that province's Arrow Lakes-Slocan region.  The hill, located at the east end of the lake adjacent to BC Hwy 6 has a T-Bar and rope tow and a daylodge with cafeteria with rentals and lessons.  The area features night skiing, snowboarding and a cross-country ski/ snowshoe trail.

Average annual snowfall is 3.8 m (12.5 ft), with a vertical drop of 152m (500 ft) on 12 hectares (30 acres).  There are eight runs, the longest of which is 152m (500 ft).

See also

 List of ski areas and resorts in Canada

References
Ski Summit Lake website
britishcolumbia.com webpage
Joanne Buckman

Arrow Lakes
Slocan Valley
Ski areas and resorts in British Columbia